Pál Gábor (2 November 1932 – 21 October 1987) was a Hungarian film director and screenwriter. He directed 20 films between 1962 and 1987. In 1979, he was a member of the jury at the 29th Berlin International Film Festival.

His most famous work was 1978's Angi Vera, about a woman in a re-education camp in post-war Hungary.  His films usually focused on the concerns of people in communist Hungary.

Selected filmography
 Tiltott terület (1968)
 Horizont (1970)
 Utazás Jakabbal (1972)
 A járvány (1975)
 Angi Vera (1978)
 Kettévált mennyezet (1981)
 Hosszú vágta (1983)
 A menyasszony gyönyörű volt (1986)

References

External links

1932 births
1987 deaths
Hungarian film directors
Male screenwriters
Hungarian male writers
Writers from Budapest
20th-century Hungarian screenwriters